was a Japanese actor and voice actor.

He died on 23 April 2020 from heart failure.

Filmography

Films
The Insect Woman (1963) - Investigator
Tora! Tora! Tora! (1970) - First Secretary Katsuzo Okumura (uncredited)
Karafuto 1945 Summer Hyosetsu no Mon (1974) - Watabe
Kinkanshoku (1975) - Prime Minister
Tora-san's Sunrise and Sunset (1976) - Mayor of Tatsuno
Yojōhan seishun garasu-bari (1976) - Detective
Fumō Chitai (1976) - Cabinet minister
Female Teacher (1977) - Kamino / Schoolmaster
Kitamura Toukoku: Waga fuyu no uta (1977)
The Resurrection of the Golden Wolf (1979) - Hyōgo
Dōran (1980) - Kinzo Mizoguchi
Shag (1989)
Graduation Journey: I Came from Japan (1993) - Narrator
Pipi to benai hotaru (1996) - Elder Stag

Television dramas
Key Hunter (1968) - Killer Ueno
Kunitori Monogatari (1973) - Akechi Mitsuyasu
Taiyō ni Hoero! (1978–1979) - Soda
Oretachi wa Tenshi da! (1979) episode#1 - Funashima
Kusa Moeru (1979) - Itō Sukechika
Kinpachi-sensei (1981) - Ōyama
Shadow Warriors (1981) - Tokugawa Mitsukuni
Ōoka Echizen (1983) - Old man
Tokugawa Ieyasu (1983) - Katagiri Katsumoto
Chōshichirō Edo Nikki (1983) - Amemiya
Edo o Kiru (1987) - Matsudaira Izuminokami
Hachidai Shōgun Yoshimune (1995) - Ōkubo Tadatomo

Stage
Death of a Salesman
The Lower Depths
The Merchant of Venice
The Tempest

Television animation
Botchan (1980) - Narrator
In the Beginning: The Bible Stories (1992) - Narrator
Phoenix (2004) - Narrator

Anime films
Cobra (1982) - Toporo
Crusher Joe (1983) - Dan
Penguin's Memory - Shiawase monogatari (1985) - The Librarian
Doraemon: Nobita's the Night Before a Wedding (1999) - Shizuka's Papa

Video games
The Legend of Dragoon (1999) - Dewey

Dubbing

Live-action
Humphrey Bogart
Angels with Dirty Faces (Jim Frazier)
The Roaring Twenties (George Hally)
The Maltese Falcon (Sam Spade)
Casablanca (1967 TV Asahi edition) (Rick Blaine)
Action in the North Atlantic (First Officer Joe Rossi)
Sahara (Sergeant Joe Gunn)
To Have and Have Not (Harry "Steve" Morgan)
The Big Sleep (Philip Marlowe)
Key Largo (1967 TV Asahi edition) (Maj. Frank McCloud)
The Treasure of the Sierra Madre (Fred C. Dobbs)
The African Queen (Charlie Allnut)
The Barefoot Contessa (1966 TV Asahi and 1979 TV Tokyo editions) (Harry Dawes)
The Caine Mutiny (1979 Fuji TV edition) (Lt. Cmdr. Philip Francis Queeg)
Sabrina (Linus Larrabee)
The Desperate Hours (NHK edition (Glenn Griffin))
The Bridge on the River Kwai (1976 Fuji TV edition) (Lieutenant Colonel Nicholson (Alec Guinness))
The Changeling (John Russell (George C. Scott))
Charlie and the Chocolate Factory (2008 NTV edition) (Dr. Wilbur Wonka (Christopher Lee))
Cinema Paradiso (Alfredo (Philippe Noiret))
Clash of the Titans (1985 TV Asahi edition) (Ammon (Burgess Meredith))
Julia (1980 Fuji TV edition) (Dashiell Hammett (Jason Robards))
Sherlock Holmes (Mycroft Holmes (Charles Gray))
Star Wars (1983 NTV edition) (Obi-Wan Kenobi (Alec Guinness))

Animated Films
Fun and Fancy Free (Pony Canyon edition (Edgar Bergen))
The Little Mermaid (King Triton)
The Many Adventures of Winnie the Pooh (Pony Canyon edition (Narrator))
Song of the South (Pony Canyon edition (Uncle Remus))

Television Animation
SWAT Kats: The Radical Squadron (Pastmaster)

Honours
 Medal of Honour with Purple Ribbon (1992)
 Order of the Rising Sun, 4th Class, Gold Rays with Rosette (1997)

References

External links
 
 

1924 births
2020 deaths
Azabu High School alumni
Hitotsubashi University alumni
Japanese male voice actors
Male voice actors from Tokyo
Academic staff of Nihon University
Recipients of the Medal with Purple Ribbon
Recipients of the Order of the Rising Sun, 4th class
20th-century Japanese male actors